The Vistula (Polish: Wisła) is the chief river of Poland.

Vistula or Wisła may also refer to:
 Wisła, a town in Silesian Voivodeship close to the source of the Vistula
 Vistula Land (1815-1915), name for Russian Congress Poland from 1867 to 1915
 Vistula Spit, a stretch of land on the Baltic coast
 Vistula Lagoon, a fresh-water lagoon behind the Vistula Spit
 Vistula legion was a unit of Poles in the service of Napoleonic France
 Wisła Kraków, a Polish football club from Kraków
 Wisła Płock, a Polish football club from Płock
 Operation Vistula, code name for a Polish army operation displacing Ukrainians and Ruthenians in Poland after World War II
 German Army Group Vistula, a German military unit in World War II
 Vistula, Michigan, a former town in what is now the city of Toledo, Ohio
 Vistula, Indiana, an unincorporated village northeast of Elkhart, Indiana
 Tatiana Wisła, a supporting character from the anime series Last Exile